Watcharakorn Antakhamphu (born September 12, 1974) is a Thai professional football manager and former football player.

Managerial career
In October 2015, Watcharakorn was named the interim manager of Army United. In December 2015 it was announced that Watcharakorn would become the new manager of Army United.

References

Antakhamphu, Watcharakorn
Antakhamphu, Watcharakorn
Watcharakorn Antakhamphu
Antakhamphu, Watcharakorn
Watcharakorn Antakhamphu
Watcharakorn Antakhamphu
Watcharakorn Antakhamphu
Watcharakorn Antakhamphu
Watcharakorn Antakhamphu
Footballers at the 1998 Asian Games
Watcharakorn Antakhamphu
Watcharakorn Antakhamphu